Kalmbist is a village in the Sindhudurg district of the Konkan division of the Indian state of Maharashtra.

Villages in Sindhudurg district

bfdfr